Kevin Hulsmans (born 11 April 1978 in Lommel) is a Belgian former professional road bicycle racer, who rode professionally between 2000 and 2015.

Major results

2000
1st Stage 9 Niedersachsen-Rundfahrt
2002
1st Stage 1 Circuit Franco-Belge (Omloop van het Houtland)
6th Omloop Het Volk
2007
5th Nationale Sluitingsprijs
7th Overall Three Days of De Panne
2009
5th Overall Driedaagse van West-Vlaanderen
2011
9th Omloop der Kempen

Grand Tour general classification results timeline

Post-Retirement
Hulsmans played Italian cyclist Filippo Simeoni in the 2015 film The Program.

References

External links
 

Belgian male cyclists
1978 births
Living people
People from Lommel
Cyclists from Limburg (Belgium)